Rhoda Faye Morgenstern, portrayed by Valerie Harper, is a fictional character on the television sitcom The Mary Tyler Moore Show and subsequent spin-off, Rhoda.

Character background
The original opening of the series Rhoda establishes that Rhoda Faye Morgenstern was born in the Bronx, New York, in December 1941. Her family is Jewish.  She is the daughter of Ida and Martin Morgenstern (Nancy Walker and Harold Gould), and grew up in New York before moving to Minneapolis, Minnesota sometime in the late 1960s. On The Mary Tyler Moore Show Rhoda had a sister named Debbie (Liberty Williams), seen in one episode, and a briefly-mentioned brother named Arnold; these two were retconned out of the back story when the character got her own series. On Rhoda, Rhoda's only sibling was a younger sister named Brenda, although in the sixth episode, Brenda refers to herself as Rhoda's "youngest sister."

The Mary Tyler Moore Show

Relocating from New York City, Rhoda was a window dresser at Hempel's after being fired from Bloomfield's department store in Minneapolis. (She also became the proprietor of a plant boutique in one third-season episode, though this was not referenced again). She rented an attic loft apartment in the same house as the building manager, Phyllis Lindstrom.

In the debut episode, Mary Richards moved into the larger apartment, one floor below, which Rhoda had been trying to secure for herself. This caused the two to initially clash, but in spite of themselves and their differences (Mary was a polite, sophisticated mid-westerner, Rhoda was an astringent, brash New Yorker) they quickly became best friends.

Throughout the series, Rhoda and Phyllis maintained an adversarial but somewhat friendly relationship. She also developed a close bond with Phyllis's daughter, Bess, who referred to Rhoda as her "aunt."

While living in Minneapolis, Rhoda received infrequent visits from her parents.

Rhoda

In 1974, Harper departed from The Mary Tyler Moore Show to star in Rhoda.

In Rhoda, Rhoda Morgenstern moved back to New York City, where she met ruggedly handsome Joe Gerard (David Groh) and married him soon afterward.  The couple moved into the same building occupied by Rhoda's sister, Brenda, and for the first two years of the show, Rhoda worked in her own small window dressing company while Joe pursued his career as a building contractor.  Brenda, a single, insecure, self-conscious bank teller, often turned to Rhoda for advice (especially about her love life), and Rhoda's parents Ida and Martin were seen frequently.

Rhoda's marriage soured after two years, and Rhoda and Joe eventually divorced.  Later episodes featured Rhoda tentatively re-entering the dating scene. She also wound down her struggling window dressing company, and took a job at a costume company.

Mary and Rhoda
Rhoda gave up her career as a window dresser/costume designer and pursued a career as a photographer in the time between the 1978 cancellation of Rhoda and the 2000 made-for-television movie Mary and Rhoda. By this time she had also married and divorced Jean-Pierre Rousseau, a union which produced her only child, a daughter named Meredith. Mary and Rhoda had lost track of one-another after an argument over Rhoda's second husband, whom Mary disliked, but they reconnected and reestablished their friendship in the 2000 movie.

Reception
Harper won four Primetime Emmy Awards for her portrayal of Rhoda, with three of these awards for The Mary Tyler Moore Show and one for Rhoda. In 2006, Entertainment Weekly ranked Rhoda Morgenstern 23rd on its list of the best sidekicks ever. Bravo ranked Rhoda 57th on their list of the 100 greatest TV characters. In 2000, Time magazine stated that Rhoda's relationship with Mary Richards was "one of the most renowned friendships in TV."

References

Fictional American Jews
Fictional characters from New York City
Fictional characters from Minnesota
Television characters introduced in 1970
The Mary Tyler Moore Show characters
Window dressers
American female characters in television